Claude Champy (born September 12, 1944) is a French ceramist.

In 1988, he received the Grand Prix of the Suntory Museum of Art. At that time he formed links with Japanese ceramists and also created Raku ware.

His works are part of the Charles-Adrien Buéno's collection.

See also 
 Paul Soldner, an American Raku ware ceramic artist

References

Further reading 
 Moderne Keramik aus Frankreich: 1970 bis 2000. Aus der Sammlung Kermer. Theodor-Zink-Museum, Wadgasserhof, Kaiserslautern 2014 (Exhibition catalogue: Kaiserslautern, 11 October 2014 – 15 February 2015). .
 « Claude Champy, Terre complice », La Revue de la Céramique et du Verre. 
 Entrevue avec Claude Champy (DVD), collection Terre par Les Films de Jade. Film tourné en 1994
 Exposition permanente à la Galerie 22, Coustellet, Vaucluse

French ceramists
1944 births
Living people